Inês Gaspar Murta (born 31 May 1997) is a Portuguese tennis player. She is the sister of André Gaspar Murta who is also a professional tennis player.

Murta has won one singles title and 14 doubles titles on the ITF Circuit. On 6 February 2017, she reached her best singles ranking of world No. 546. On 14 March 2022, she peaked at No. 267 in the doubles rankings.

Playing for Portugal Fed Cup team, she has a win–loss record of 3–10 in Billie Jean King Cup competitions.

Murta is currently coached by Nina Bratchikova and Pedro Pereira.

ITF finals

Singles: 4 (1 title, 3 runner–ups)

Doubles: 29 (14 titles, 15 runner–ups)

References

External links

 
 
 

1997 births
Living people
People from Faro, Portugal
Portuguese female tennis players
Competitors at the 2018 Mediterranean Games
Mediterranean Games competitors for Portugal
Sportspeople from Faro District
21st-century Portuguese women